The Neptunian Desert or sub-Jovian desert is broadly defined as the region close to a star  where no Neptune-sized  exoplanets are found. This zone receives strong irradiation from the star, meaning the planets cannot retain their gaseous atmospheres: They evaporate, leaving just a rocky core.

Neptune-sized planets should be easier to find in short-period orbits, and many sufficiently massive planets have been discovered with longer orbits from surveys such as CoRoT and Kepler. The physical mechanisms that result in the observed Neptunian Desert are currently unknown, but have been suggested to be due to a different formation mechanism for short-period super-Earth and Jovian exoplanets, similar to the reasons for the brown dwarf desert.

The exoplanet NGTS-4b, with mass of 20 , and a radius 20% smaller than Neptune, was found to still have an atmosphere while orbiting every 1.3 days within the 'Neptunian Desert' of NGTS-4, a K-dwarf star located 922 light-years from Earth.  The atmosphere may have survived due to the planet's unusually high core mass, or it might have migrated to its current close-in orbit after this epoch of maximum stellar activity.

See also
 Brown-dwarf desert
 Planetary migration
 List of exoplanets discovered in 2019

Notes 

Planetary science